Arabella is a village in Highland, Scotland.

History

Named after the farm which was set aside as small holdings in 1918 for returning servicemen.  The original Farm was named after the wife of Hugh Rose a wealthy land owner who made his fortune in the West Indies in the late 18th century.  Arabella Phipps married Hugh Rose in 1799 in London.  She lived in Scotland for 7 years and had three children.  She died in mysterious circumstances in 1806.

Landmarks
Landmarks include Listed Building Arabella House, the one-time residence of John Osler Chattock Hayes.

References

Populated places in Ross and Cromarty